The Babe Zaharias Open was a golf tournament on the LPGA Tour from 1953 to 1967. It was played in Beaumont, Texas at the Beaumont Country Club from 1953 to 1964 and at the Bayou Din Golf Club from 1965 to 1967. Babe Zaharias, LPGA co-founder and Beaumont resident, hosted the tournament until her death in 1956. She won the first edition of the event.

Winners
1967 Marilynn Smith
1966 Shirley Englehorn
1965 Marlene Hagge
1964 Ruth Jessen
1963 Mickey Wright
1962 Kathy Cornelius and Betsy Rawls (tie, unofficial)
1961 Mary Lena Faulk
1960 Betsy Rawls
1959 Betsy Rawls
1958 Louise Suggs
1957 Marlene Hagge
1956 Marlene Hagge
1955 Betty Jameson
1954 Louise Suggs
1953 Babe Zaharias

See also
Babe Zaharias Invitational - an unrelated LPGA Tour event played in Ohio in 1976

References

Former LPGA Tour events
Golf in Texas
Beaumont, Texas
Women's sports in Texas
Recurring sporting events established in 1953
Recurring sporting events disestablished in 1967
1953 establishments in Texas
1967 disestablishments in Texas